Nothobranchius ocellatus is a species of killifish in the family Nothobranchiidae. It is endemic to Tanzania. This species was described as Paranothobranchius ocellatus in 1985 by Lothar Seegers with the type locality given as being a swamp between Mtanza and the northern entrance of the Selous Game Reserve in the drainage basin of the Rufiji River north of Rufiji in eastern Tanzania.

References

ocellatus
Endemic freshwater fish of Tanzania
Fish described in 1985
Taxa named by Lothar Seegers
Taxonomy articles created by Polbot